Albania has a multi-party system with two major political parties and few smaller ones that are electorally successful. According to official data from the Central Election Commission, there were a total of 124 political parties listed in the party registry for the year 2014. Only 54 of these parties participated in the 2015 local elections.

Parties represented in the Parliament of Albania
This is a list of political parties with representation in the Albanian parliament following the general parliamentary elections of 2021.

Political parties in Albania (1921–present)

This is a list of noted political parties that have participated in Albania's elections from 1921 to present day.

See also
 Politics of Albania
 List of political parties by country
 MJAFT!
 Liberalism in Albania

References

Albania
 
Political parties
Political parties
Albania